Hrabeiella periglandulata is the sole representative belonging to the family Hrabeiellidae, a family of annelids.

Species:

Hrabeiella periglandulata

References

Annelids